John Conner (person) may refer to:

 John Conner (American football) (born 1987), American football fullback
 John Conner (footballer) (1896–?), Scottish forward who played for Belfast Distillery, Crystal Palace and Newport County
 John C. Conner (1842–1873), U.S. Representative from Texas
 John Conner (1758–1826), founder of Connersville, Indiana
 John Chellis Conner (1913–2001), American marimbist
 John Wayne Conner (19562016), American murderer executed in Georgia
 Jack Conner (1898–1967), Scottish wing-half who played for Alloa Athletic, Celtic, Plymouth Argyle, Newport County and Torquay United
Mark Dice (born 1977), American YouTuber formerly known by the pseudonym John Conner

See also 

 John Connor (disambiguation) (other uses)